The March 722 was a British open-wheel formula race car chassis, designed, developed and built by March Engineering, for both Formula 2 and Formula B racing categories, in 1972.

References

Formula Two cars
March vehicles